Malick Sall (born 2 April 1956) is a Senegalese politician currently serving as Minister of Justice in the Fourth Sall government.

Early life 
Sall was born in Danthiady. He graduated from Cheikh Anta Diop University.

Political career 
Sall was appointed to government in 2020.

References 

Living people
1956 births
21st-century Senegalese politicians
Government ministers of Senegal
Justice ministers of Senegal
Senegalese lawyers
Cheikh Anta Diop University alumni